
The Tamil Bell is a broken bronze bell discovered in approximately 1836 by missionary William Colenso. It was being used as a pot to boil potatoes by Māori women near Whangarei in the Northland Region of New Zealand.

The bell is 13 cm long and 9 cm deep, and has an inscription. The inscription running around the rim of the bell has been identified as old Tamil. The inscription reads "Mukaiyyatīṉ vakkucu uṭaiya kappal uṭaiya maṇi". This translates in English to "Mohoyiden Buks ship’s bell". Some of the characters in the inscription are of an archaic form no longer seen in modern Tamil script, thus suggesting that the bell could be about 500 years old, possibly from the Later Pandya period.  It is thus what is sometimes called an out-of-place artefact.

Indologist V. R. Ramachandra Dikshitar states in his The Origin and Spread of the Tamils that ancient Tamil sea-farers might have had a knowledge of Australia and Polynesia. The discovery of the bell has led to speculation about a possible Tamil presence in New Zealand, but the bell is not in itself proof of early Tamil contact with New Zealand'. Seafarers from Trincomalee may have reached New Zealand during the period of increased trade between the Vanni country and South East Asia. The bell might have been dropped off the shore by a Portuguese ship, whose sailors had been in touch with the Indians. Also, a number of Indian vessels had been captured by the Europeans during the period; thus, another possibility is that the bell might have belonged to such a wrecked vessel, cast away on the New Zealand shores.

The bell was bequeathed by William Colenso to the Dominion Museum – now the Museum of New Zealand Te Papa Tongarewa.

See also
 Indian copper plate inscriptions
 Laguna Copperplate Inscription
 Pallava script
 Tamil copper-plate inscriptions
 Tamil inscriptions
 Tamil script
 Theory of Portuguese discovery of Australia

References

Further reading

 
 
 
  http://rsnz.natlib.govt.nz/volume/rsnz_04/rsnz_04_00_000580.html#n43

External links
Picture of the bell at Te Ara: The Encyclopedia of New Zealand
The Tamil Bell from the collection of the Museum of New Zealand Te Papa Tongarewa

History of New Zealand
Tamil history
Individual bells
Tamil inscriptions